Françoise Billiard, known as Madame/Mme Grassot or Fanny Grassot, was a French theatre actress, born in 1810 (some sources say 1811) and died at the Rossini retirement home, rue Mirabeau in Paris, on June 23, 1892 (some sources say 1893).

She performed in traveling troupes then at the Théâtre du Gymnase from 1833. Also cited at the Palais-Royal. In 1868, aged 57, with thirty years in the theatre, she received a pension of 200 francs by the Society of Artists (Société des Artistes).

She married actor Paul Grassot in Paris on May 29, 1852 (some sources say earlier).

Theatre credits include Clara Soleil by Edmond Gondinet and Pierre Sivrac (1885) and La Cachucha by Desvergers, both at Théâtre du Vaudeville, and many more.

Theatre credits 
Selected credits listed below.

References

External links 

 Virtual International Authority File (Virtual International Authority File)
 ISNI - International Standard Name Identifier (ISNI - International Standard Name Identifier)
 IdRef - Grassot, Fanny (actress; 1811-1893)
 Mrs Grassot / Françoise Billard on Les Archives du Spectacle - A search engine for the performing arts

1810 births
1892 deaths
French stage actresses